The Slade Baronetcy, of Maunsel House in the County of Somerset, is a title in the Baronetage of the United Kingdom. It was created on 30 September 1831 for General Sir John Slade, a Peninsular War veteran. The second Baronet was a lawyer. The third Baronet served as Receiver-General of Inland Revenue.

Madeleine Slade (Mirabehn), a disciple of Mahatma Gandhi, was the granddaughter of the first Baronet.

Slade baronets, of Maunsel Grange, Somerset (1831)
Sir John Slade, 1st Baronet (1762–1859)
Sir Frederic William Slade, 2nd Baronet (1801–1863)
Sir Alfred Frederic Adolphus Slade, 3rd Baronet (1834–1890)
Sir Cuthbert Slade, 4th Baronet (1863–1908)
Sir Alfred Fothringham Slade, 5th Baronet (1898–1960)
Sir Michael Nial Slade, 6th Baronet (1900–1962)
Sir (Julian) Benjamin Anthony Slade, 7th Baronet (born 1946)

References

Kidd, Charles, Williamson, David (editors). Debrett's Peerage and Baronetage (1990 edition). New York: St Martin's Press, 1990.

Slade